South Carolina Highway 395 (SC 395) is a  state highway in the U.S. state of South Carolina. The highway connects the Lake Murray area with Newberry.

Route description
SC 395 begins at an intersection with SC 194 (Denny Highway) at a point northeast of Saluda and west of Lake Murray, within northeastern Saluda County. From this intersection, the roadway continues southeast as Sports Road. SC 395 travels to the north and curves to the northeast before crossing the Saluda River, where it enters Newberry County. It travels in a northerly direction and curves to the north-northeast. The highway crosses over the Bush River. Then, it crosses Scott Creek, passes Gallman Elementary School, and curves to the northwest before it enters the city limits of Newberry. The highway intersects SC 34 (Dixie Drive). In town, it crosses railroad tracks, passes Margaret Hunter Park, and crosses the same railroad tracks again. On the northwestern edge of Newberry, it meets its northern terminus, an intersection with SC 121 (Kendall Road). This intersection is just southwest of Marion Davis Park.

Major intersections

See also

References

External links

SC 395South Carolina Hwy Index

395
Transportation in Saluda County, South Carolina
Transportation in Newberry County, South Carolina